Jason Steele may refer to:

 Jason Steele (politician) (born 1948), American politician
 Jason Steele (footballer) (born 1990), English goalkeeper
 Jason Steele (wrestler) (born 1980), wrestler and bodybuilder
 Jason Steele, the creator of Charlie the Unicorn and Llamas with Hats